Wayne Anthony Dessaur (born 4 February 1971, in Nottingham) is a former English cricketer. He was a right-handed batsman and an occasional right-arm medium-pace bowler who played for Nottinghamshire and Derbyshire in a three-year first-class cricketing career.

Educated at Loughborough Grammar School, he first represented Nottinghamshire in the Second XI Championship in 1989. He started his career as an upper-middle order batsman, and later moved to the opening position. On his debut for Derbyshire in May 1995 he hit a century against Oxford University. However, his contract was not renewed after the 1995 County Championship.

After finishing at Derbyshire he studied at Nottingham University, gaining a degree in physiotherapy. He emigrated to Australia, where he has his own physiotherapy practice in Adelaide. He is also involved with South Australia Cricket.  In 2008 he and Mary E. Magarey published a review article in the Journal of Orthopaedic and Sports Physical Therapy entitled "Diagnostic Accuracy of Clinical Tests for Superior Labral Anterior Posterior Lesions : A Systematic Review".

References

External links

Wayne Dessaur at Cricket Archive

1971 births
English cricketers
Living people
Nottinghamshire cricketers
Derbyshire cricketers
People educated at Loughborough Grammar School
Alumni of the University of Nottingham
British physiotherapists